Dewsbury Celtic is a rugby league club in the town of Dewsbury, West Yorkshire. They play in the NCL Division Two after gaining promotion from Division Three in the Autumn of 2019. 

They followed this promotion with a tour of Australia, facing two amateur sides from Cronulla. They were the first ever amateur rugby league team to successfully fundraise a tour to Australia. 

Coach Paul Heaton took the reins from Brendan Sheridan after the tour, and before the cancellation of amateur sport due to COVID-19, were top of Division Two.

History
Dewsbury Celtic is one of the oldest Irish sports clubs in Yorkshire and possibly Britain.
The origins of Dewsbury Celtic can be directly linked to Ireland’s Great Famine of 1845. Official records show that in 1845 200 Irish immigrants were living in Daw Green, Westtown. By 1851 the number had risen to 1,000 working mainly as labourers and mill workers.

Having started as Dewsbury Shamrocks in 1879 they switched in the late 1890s to football, returning to rugby league in 1910. At this point they joined what was then the Northern Union and changed their name to Dewsbury Celtic. They became one of the best local teams and won the Yorkshire County Amateur Cup in 1912–13. This team was torn apart by the First World War, losing 15 players. They reformed in 1919 and then disbanded again in 1939 at the start of the Second World War.

In the post-war period the club reformed and became one of the most famous names in amateur rugby league, and their name was feared by professional clubs drawn against them in the Rugby League Challenge Cup. Celtic continued to win trophies on a regular basis, these included the Yorkshire Cup, Leeds League titles and George Oldroyd Trophy 13 times between 1953 and 1969.

In recent times other local teams have overtaken Celtic in the league structure and in an effort to revitalise the club they switched to summer rugby in 2005, taking over the fixtures of the defunct Manchester Knights in the Central Premier. In 2006 they applied for National League Three, finishing in 5th place and qualifying for the play-offs, where they lost to St Albans Centurions.

In 2007 National League Three was rebranded as the Rugby League Conference National Division and Celtic were one of six Yorkshire teams in the ten team league. They achieved their highest place to-date with a very good 4th place. They also competed in the Northern Rail Cup, finishing behind Bramley Buffaloes, who qualified for the knock-out stages.

In 2019 Dewsbury Celtic competed in the Kingstone Press NCL (Division Three) competing against teams from all over the country. Brendan Sheridan and Mark Brierley coached them to win promotion in an outstanding play off final win over Heworth ARLFC gaining promotion to the NCL Division 2. 

Shortly after this, Celtic toured Australia in November 2019 returning to England with one win under their belt down under. They beat Penshurst RSL 4–10 but fell short in their second battle to De La Salle losing 34–10. Soon after a successful season, Head coach Brendan Sheridan was appointed assistant coach at Oldham RLFC in the Betfred Championship. 

Now in 2020, Paul Heaton, Mark Brierley and Dom Byrne take on the challenge of keeping Celtic up in the second division.

Honours
National Conference Division 3 Play Off Final Winners: 2019 
BARLA U18s Yorkshire Cup Winners: V Stanningley
2016/2017
Yorkshire U18s Youth Cup Winners: V Milford 2010
Yorkshire U18s Youth Cup Winners: V Upton 2008
Yorkshire Cup Winners: 1914/15, 1964/65, 1971/72, 1973/74
Yorkshire Cup Runners: Up 1958/59
BARLA Yorkshire Cup Winners: 1974/75, 1976/77
BARLA Yorkshire Cup Runners Up: 1975/76, 1999/2000
BARLA National Cup Runners Up: 1980
National Conference League Div 2 Runners Up: 1991/92
Rugby Leaguer Cup Winners: V Pilkingtons 1972
Leeds League Div 1 Champions: 1962, 1965, 1974
Leeds League Div 2 Champions: 1967
George Oldroyd Trophy Winners: 1953, 1955, 1956, 1959, 1960, 1961, 1962, 1963, 1964, 1965,1966, 1967, 1969, 1971, 1973
Donald Green Memorial Cup Winners: 1972, 1974
Rose Bowl winners: 1952
Huddersfield Examiner Trophy Winners: 1972, 1974
Bernard Lee Memorial Trophy Winners: 1974
Bill Norfolk Cup Winners: 1977
West Yorkshire Challenge Cup/Championship Cup/League Cup Treble: 1977
Yorkshire League Premier Div Champions: 1988/89
Yorkshire League Senior Div Champions: 1998/99, 2003/04
Yorkshire League Senior Div Top Four playoff Winners: 1998/99
Yorkshire League Senior Cup Winners: 1998/99
Yorkshire League Senior Cup Runners Up: 2000/01
Heavy Woollen Jim Brown Cup Winners 32 times since 1954/55

Juniors
Dewsbury Celtic run junior teams in the Yorkshire Juniors' league

References

External links
 Official website

Rugby League Conference teams
Sport in Dewsbury
Rugby clubs established in 1879
Rugby league teams in West Yorkshire
1879 establishments in England
English rugby league teams